Mwesa Isaiah Mapoma is one of Zambia's best-known ethnomusicologists. Considered by many a pioneer in the field of African ethnomusicology, Mwesa Mapoma was born in Kombaniya village in Mansa on November 2, 1936, and died on November 16, 2020. A graduate of Zambia's famed Munali Boy's Secondary School, and Trinity College in London, Dr. Mapoma received his Doctorate in Music from the University of California, Los Angeles (UCLA). His dissertation research focused on the royal musicians of the Bemba people in Zambia's Luapula Province. His field recordings are housed in the UCLA ethnomusicology archive. Dr. Mapoma is remembered as tireless champion of African arts, culture, music and tradition.

Further reading
Mapoma, Isaiah Mwesa, "The Use of Folk Music among Some Bemba Church Congregations in Zambia", 72-88, Yearbook of the International Folk Music Council, 1, 1969
Mapoma, Isaiah Mwesa, Ingomba: The Royal Musicians of the Bemba People of Luapula Province in Zambia UCLA PhD dissertation.
Mapoma, Isaiah Mwesa, The Determinants of Style in the Music of Ingomba, UCLA MA thesis.

External links
 UCLA ethnomusicology archive

Ethnomusicologists
UCLA School of the Arts and Architecture alumni
Year of birth missing (living people)
Living people
Zambian academics